The 2022 Emilia-Romagna Open was a professional tennis tournament played on clay courts in Parma, Italy as an ATP Challenger Tour 125 event for the men and a WTA 250 event for the women. The fifth edition of the men's event was held between 13 and 19 June on the 2022 ATP Challenger Tour, while the second edition of the women's took place from 26 September to 1 October on the 2022 WTA Tour.

The women's event was one of the six tournaments that were given single-year WTA 250 licenses in September and October 2022 due to the cancellation of tournaments in China during the 2022 season because of the ongoing COVID-19 pandemic, as well as the suspension of tournaments in China following former WTA player Peng Shuai's allegation of sexual assault against a Chinese government official.

Champions

Men's singles

 Borna Ćorić def.  Elias Ymer 7–6(7–4), 6–0.

Women's singles 

  Mayar Sherif def.  Maria Sakkari 7–5, 6–3

Men's doubles

 Luciano Darderi /  Fernando Romboli def.  Denys Molchanov /  Igor Zelenay 6–2, 6–3.

Women's doubles 

  Anastasia Dețiuc /  Miriam Kolodziejová def.  Arantxa Rus /  Tamara Zidanšek 1–6, 6–3, [10–8]

Men's singles main-draw entrants

Seeds

 1 Rankings are as of 6 June 2022.

Other entrants
The following players received wildcards into the singles main draw:
  Borna Ćorić
  Francesco Passaro
  Giulio Zeppieri

The following player received entry into the singles main draw as a special exempt:
  Riccardo Bonadio

The following player received entry into the singles main draw as an alternate:
  Andrea Arnaboldi

The following players received entry from the qualifying draw:
  João Domingues
  Michael Geerts
  David Ionel
  Jozef Kovalík
  Nicolas Moreno de Alboran
  Oriol Roca Batalla

The following player received entry as a lucky loser:
  Andrej Martin

Women's singles main-draw entrants

Seeds 

† Rankings are as of 19 September 2022.

Other entrants 
The following players received wildcard entry into the singles main draw:
  Sara Errani
  Matilde Paoletti
  Maria Sakkari

The following players received entry from qualifying draw:
  Erika Andreeva
  Kateryna Baindl
  Réka Luca Jani
  Jule Niemeier
  Anna Karolína Schmiedlová
  Simona Waltert

The following player received entry as a lucky loser: 
  Gabriela Lee

Withdrawals 
 Before the tournament
  Alizé Cornet → replaced by  Elisabetta Cocciaretto
  Varvara Gracheva → replaced by  Gabriela Lee
  Kaja Juvan → replaced by  Arantxa Rus
  Anna Kalinskaya → replaced by  Maryna Zanevska
  Tatjana Maria → replaced by  Laura Pigossi
  Yulia Putintseva → replaced by  Océane Dodin
  Liudmila Samsonova → replaced by  Viktoriya Tomova

Women's doubles draw entrants

Seeds 

 1 Rankings as of 19 September 2022.

Other entrants
The following pairs received wildcards into the doubles main draw:
  Elisabetta Cocciaretto /  Matilde Paoletti
  Francesca Pace /  Federica Urgesi

Withdrawals 
 Before the tournament
  Kaitlyn Christian /  Lidziya Marozava → replaced by  Kaitlyn Christian /  Han Xinyun
  Andrea Gámiz /  Eva Vedder → replaced by  Alena Fomina-Klotz /  Oksana Selekhmeteva
  Jesika Malečková /  Raluca Olaru → replaced by  Anna Danilina /  Jesika Malečková
  Alexandra Panova /  Katarzyna Piter → replaced by  Emily Appleton /  Quinn Gleason

References

2022 WTA Tour
2022 ATP Challenger Tour
2022 in Italian tennis
June 2022 sports events in Italy
September 2022 sports events in Italy
October 2022 sports events in Italy
Emilia-Romagna Open